KWLK (88.5 FM) is a radio station licensed to Westwood, California, United States. The station is currently owned by Calvary Chapel of Susanville.

History
The station began broadcasting in 2006 and was owned by CSN International. It was originally licensed to Quincy, California and held the call sign KJCQ. In 2008, CSN International sold KJCQ, along with a number of other stations, to Calvary Radio Network, Inc. These stations were sold to Calvary Chapel Costa Mesa later that year. In 2010, Calvary Chapel Costa Mesa sold KJCQ, along with KJCU and two translators, to Living Proof, Inc. for $100,000. In 2013, the station was sold to Calvary Chapel of Susanville for $50,000, and its call sign was changed to KWLK.

References

External links

WLK
Radio stations established in 2006
2006 establishments in California